Patrick Lindner (born 27 September 1960 in Munich, West Germany) is a German Volksmusik singer.

Life
Born as Friedrich Günther Raab, Lindner worked as a chef before his breakthrough in 1989 when he was second in the Grand Prix der Volksmusik. He then released various singles and albums and hosted TV shows such as "Patrick Lindner persönlich" ("Patrick Lindner Personally"), "So ein Tag mit guten Freunden" ("A Day with Good Friends"), and the "Patrick Lindner Show" on ZDF (until 1998). He also had appearances in movies and series as "Weißblaue Wintergeschichten" ("Wintertime Stories"), "Das Traumschiff", and "SOKO München".

By 1997, Lindner abandoned classical Volksmusik to make more progressive music. By this time, his coming out and his relationship with manager Michael Link made him popular in Germany – newspapers called them a "Germany's top gay couple". They adopted eight-month-old Daniel, a child brought up in an institution in Russia. Link wrote the children's books "Come I'll show you my parents" and "Adventure Adoption or: a lifetime dream comes true" in order to promote tolerance towards homosexuals. The couple broke up in March 2005.

Awards
Bambi 1991
Goldene Stimmgabel 1991, 1992, 1993, 1997 and 1999

Discography

Die kloane Tür zum Paradies (1989)
Die kleinen Dinge des Lebens (1990)
Weihnachten mit Patrick Lindner (1990)
Eine Handvoll Herzlichkeit (1991)
Ohne Zärtlichkeit geht gar nix (1992)
Träum Dich ins Paradies – meine 18 schönsten Lieder (1993)
Liebe ist das Salz der Erde (1994)
Meine Lieder streicheln Dich (1995)
Weihnachtszeit – Stille Zeit (1995)
Herzlich willkommen in meinem Leben (1996)
Das Beste aus der Patrick Lindner Show (1997)
Himmelweit (1998)
Stark genug (1999)
Wenn es noch Wunder gibt (2000)
Mammamia (2001)
Nur das Beste (2002)
Halleluja – auf das Leben (2003)
Ganz privat – meine schönsten Liebeslieder (2004)
Gigolo (2005)
Die Sonne ist für alle da (2006)
Heute, hier und jetzt (2007)
Jedes Herz braucht eine Heimat (2008)
Fang dir die Sonne (2009)
Schenk dir den Tag (2010)
Böhmisch klingt's am Besten (2012)
Nur mit deiner Liebe (2014)
Mittenrein ins Glück (2016)
Leb dein Leben (2018)

References

External links 

1960 births
German folk singers
Living people
Musicians from Munich
German LGBT singers
German gay musicians
Gay singers
20th-century German male singers
21st-century German male singers